James Rourke (June 27, 1838 – March 3, 1914) was a lumber manufacturer and political figure in New Brunswick, Canada. He represented St. John County in the Legislative Assembly of New Brunswick from 1890 to 1892 as a Liberal-Conservative. He was born in Musquash, New Brunswick. In 1871, he married Charlotte Wishart. Rourke was a captain in the local militia and served on the council for Saint John. He ran unsuccessfully for a seat in the provincial assembly in 1888.

References

The Canadian parliamentary companion, 1891 / edited by J.A. Gemmill.

Members of the Legislative Assembly of New Brunswick
1838 births
1914 deaths
People from Saint John County, New Brunswick